Los Reyes (The Kings) is a telenovela filmed in Colombia and produced by the Colombian network, RCN (Radio Cadena Nacional - "National Radio Network"). It debuted in 2005 and is available via RCN cable TV in the United States.

Plot

Los Reyes is about a working-class family and Edilberto "Beto" Reyes, the head of the family, who suddenly gets hired as president of a multinational company. This happens when he stops the former president of the company, a middle-aged woman with a terminal disease, from committing suicide. Beto shows the woman his daily life and his people, helping her get back on her feet. The president is grateful, and goes to France to get a treatment for her disease. When she leaves, she thanks Beto by giving him the presidency of the company.

The vice president, Emilio Iriarte (wrongly called "Urinarte"), who sought the company's presidency after the former president disappeared, and his family swear to take revenge. They focus on making the Reyes family go back "where they belong", but problems arise when Emilio falls in love with Laisa, Beto's 'sister'. Laisa conducts a television show on which famous real-life celebrities appear.  354 chapters.

Other information
This comedy parodies high society and its treatment of the lower classes. There has been controversy about one character, Laisa Reyes, who is in the series and in real-life a transsexual. Reyes is well received by Colombian audiences.

Cast and crew

Cast
Enrique Carriazo as Edilberto "Beto" Reyes
Jacqueline Arenal as Mayoli "Yoli" Gonzalez
Geraldine Zivic as Natalia Bernal
Diego Trujillo as Emilio Iriarte De Las Casas
Endry Cardeño as Laisa Reyes
Julián Román as Leonardo Giovanny "Leo" Reyes
Margarita Muñoz as Maria del Pilar "Pilarica" Valenzuela
Daniel Arenas as Santiago "Santi" Iriarte
Constanza Camelo as Hilda Edilberta Reyes
Janeth Wallman as Katty Vanegas de Iriarte
Ricardo Vélez as Armando Valenzuela
Rosita Alonso as Mercedes Rubio
Jery Sandoval as Maria del Carmen Reyes
Henry Montealegre as Andres "Totoy" Reyes
Tiberio Cruz as Edgar Galindo
Jenny Vargas as Alegrina
Diego Vélez as Eliseo "Cheo" Varona
Catherine Mira as Maritza Galindo
Alberto León Jaramillo as Hernán Cifuentes
Nataly Umaña as Mónica
Juan Camilo Hernández as Mateo Santos
Jairo Camargo as Psychologist Simón Rodríguez
Katty Rangel as Lolita
Orlando Valenzuela as Martín Castro Novo
William Marquez as Ernesto 'Chiqui' Peralta
Bianca Arango as herself
Teresa Gutiérrez as Doña Flor
Marisela González as Maria Eugenia Reyes
Carmenza Gonzalez as Dulcinea
Óscar Dueñas as Jorge
Chela Del Río as Doña Rosita
Sebastián Caicedo as Francisco Guerrero
Alfonso Ortíz as Eduardo Pinzón
Beatríz Roldan as Maria Fernanda "Mafe"
Valentina Cabrera Lemaitre as Annie
Vicky Rueda as Adriana Malaber
Thana Carvajal as Luz Dary
David Ramírez López as Henrry
Lucas Velázquez as hinself

Guest stars
Raúl Santi as himself
Lucas Arnau as himself
Maia as herself
Jose Gaviria as himself
Gali Galeano as himself
Pirry as himself
Helenita Vargas as herself
Mauricio Chicho Serna as himself

Laisa's show guests
La Gata is an interview show created by Laisa within the series, these are the current guest stars.
La Ley
Ricardo Montaner
Diego Ramos
Pirry

See also 
List of Colombian TV Shows

External links

 Official page at RCN TV website

2005 telenovelas
2005 Colombian television series debuts
2006 Colombian television series endings
Colombian telenovelas
RCN Televisión telenovelas
Spanish-language telenovelas
Television shows set in Colombia